Grimlock is the name of several fictional robot characters in the Transformers robot franchise. He is usually portrayed as the leader of the Dinobots, a subfaction of Autobots who can transform into metal dinosaurs. Grimlock was known for his dialogue being spoken in the third person. In 2007, USA Today polled people as to which Transformer they want to appear in the second installment in the Transformers film series; Grimlock came in tied for second with Devastator, and he appeared in the film instead of Grimlock. Despite this setback, Grimlock would eventually appear on screen along with his Dinobot friends in the fourth installment of the Transformers film series.

Transformers: Generation 1
Grimlock is the leader of the Dinobots. Grimlock can be merciless and contemptuous of those he considers beneath him, such as human beings, and at times his fellow Autobots
.  The character's initial feeling of being superior was changed by the relationships they formed with Spike and Wheelie as they got to know them on a personal level and saw them as equals

One of Grimlock's most distinguishing features is his speech impediment, which leads him to shorten sentences and refer to himself constantly as "Me Grimlock", never "I". However, he is still an Autobot and is willing to protect the Earth as much as the Autobots. In the animated series, Grimlock's fellow Dinobots share his speech impediment, whereas in the Marvel Comics series the other Dinobots are capable of grammatically correct speech.

Grimlock is among the strongest of the Transformers, possibly an equal to, or even superior to Optimus Prime and Megatron in most continuity. In Tyrannosaurus rex mode, his powerful jaws can snap virtually anything that comes between them. He is able to breathe fire and shoot an energy ray from his mouth.

Reception

Grimlock was one of the favorite Autobots of IGN.

Grimlock was voted the 6th top Transformer who was considered to be "badass" in the comics by Topless Robot.

According to X-Entertainment Grimlock was the 2nd best Transformers figure of all time.

One of the original Grimlock toys was on display in the Natural History Museum, London. It has since been removed.

Animated series

The Transformers
The original character profiles written by Bob Budiansky and Dan Bobro indicate that Grimlock and the Dinobots were intended to come from Cybertron to Earth like most of the other Transformers. However, the cartoon would disregard this entirely.

The discovery of fossilized dinosaur bones in a cavern in their volcano base set the Earthbound Autobots on the track to creating the Dinobots. Intrigued by the creatures, and with additional knowledge supplied by Spike Witwicky, Wheeljack and Ratchet created three "Dinobots", one of which being Grimlock.

Their design specs proved to be too accurate to the creatures they were modeled on, as their primitive brains went out of control, and Grimlock and the other Dinobots almost destroyed Teletraan I, before the trio was stopped. Optimus Prime deemed them too dangerous to use again, and had them sealed back up in the cavern, but when the majority of the Autobot forces was captured by the Decepticons, Wheeljack freed them to go to their rescue. Equipped with new devices that enhanced their brainpower to functional levels, the three Dinobots successfully rescued their Autobot comrades, and Optimus Prime admitted his error.

In his private thoughts, however, Grimlock considered Optimus Prime too weak to lead, seeking the position for himself. When Soundwave read his mind and learned of this animosity, Megatron was able to trick Grimlock and the Dinobots into switching sides, attacking and capturing Optimus Prime. To stop the turncoat Dinobots, two new ones were created: Snarl and Swoop. Ultimately, it was when Optimus Prime threw himself into harm's way to save Grimlock from an explosion that he accepted his mistake and rejoined the Autobots. In a rare display of modesty and humility, Grimlock emotionally apologized to Prime, admitted his jealousy of the leader, and accepted fault for the battle. The two subsequently patched up their differences.

Although content for the moment to remain a soldier, rather than a leader, Grimlock still had trouble accepting orders, only agreeing to help stem the tide of natural disasters ravaging Earth due to Cybertron being pulled into its orbit when he realized he would die if he did not. Grimlock and the Dinobots were semi-regularly called into action when the Autobots were faced with challenges that required extra strength, such as the Sub-Atlantican invasion of Washington, D.C., or the Decepticons' control of the TORQ III supercomputer; with every piece of help he and his troops gave, Grimlock was never slow to add a scathing remark about the inabilities of the Autobots. That said, he was not unwilling to admit the failings of his own troops, either, and willingly took them to the time-displaced "Dinobot Island", where they trained in the wilderness and helped stop a Decepticon raid on the prehistoric paradise.

The final straw for Grimlock came when he and the Dinobots were injured in a Decepticon trap at an airfield. Enraged, Grimlock refused to take orders from Optimus Prime anymore, and he and the other Dinobots left. When the Autobots began to suffer from Cybertonium deficiency, Spike Witwicky and his girlfriend Carly attempted to persuade the Dinobots - who continued to function perfectly, as they had been built on Earth without Cybertonium - to steal some of the mineral from a Decepticon shipment coming in from Cybertron. Grimlock instead opted to lead the Dinobots to Cybertron itself, where they were captured by Shockwave and put to work in the Cybertonium mines, until Swoop, Spike and Carly rescued them. Brought back to Earth, the Dinobots agreed to follow Prime's order again - until such time as Grimlock did not feel like it.

By 2005, it seemed apparent that Grimlock had undergone some degree of a personality change, becoming more childish and petulant, rather than brutish and stubborn. He and the Dinobots accompanied Optimus Prime on the latter's rescue mission to Autobot City, and fought Devastator. Subsequently, the Dinobots joined Hot Rod and his companions in traveling back to Cybertron to face the evil Unicron. Also of note, it seemed that, along with the other Dinobots, Grimlock remained in his dinosaur mode almost exclusively, rarely changing back to his robot form. Throughout 2006, he regularly participated in missions with his fellow Autobots rather than the other Dinobots, battling on the planets of Chaar, Goo, Dredd and Eurythma.

In episode #78, "Madman's Paradise", Spike and Carly hosted a banquet for a visiting ambassador. Their son Daniel got bored and wandered off. Grimlock followed him, and they fell into a lost chamber where Quintessons banished their criminals to other dimensions. They slipped through to the other-dimensional realm of Menonia, and were tricked into fighting on the Red Wizard's side, only to find out that he was the Quintesson criminal, who overthrew the Golden One. Ultra Magnus, Blaster, Eject, Rewind, Ramhorn, and Steeljaw followed, and using Blaster's amplification, they help the Golden One defeat the Red Wizard. With the help of Perceptor, the Autobots and Daniel are returned to Cybertron.

Grimlock helped to sniff out the "dinosaur transform static" that implicated Trypticon in the theft of world monuments. Later in the year, when Galvatron, the new Decepticon leader, had Cybertron infused with function-inverting anti-electrons, a dose of the particles gave Grimlock super-intelligence. For the first time Grimlock identified himself as "I, Grimlock". During a mission to Unicron's disembodied head, where the Autobots were outmatched by the new Decepticon Terrorcons, Grimlock used components of Unicron's head to construct the Technobots to battle them. Combined as Computron, the Technobots felt they could not match the Terrorcons, until Grimlock transferred his super-intelligence into Computron, reverting to his old self and allowing the Autobots to claim victory.

Grimlock's greatest victory came when he and a large number of other Transformers with primitive animal-themed transformations were summoned to a world at the centre of the galaxy by the ex-assistant of the ancient genius, Primacron, creator of Unicron. The assistant had assembled these "Primitive" Transformers in the hope that their simple instincts could defeat Primacron's newest creation, Tornedron, but one by one they fell to him, with Grimlock apparently crushed under Trypticon. Grimlock survived, however, and followed Tornedron back to Primacron's lab. When Tornedron turned on his master, like his predecessor, Primacron's complicated plans and equations could not find a way to stop him; Grimlock, on the other hand, randomly flicked a switch which reversed Tornedron's energy polarity, undoing the damage the now dissipating Tornedron had done. Grimlock decimated Primacron's lab while dancing around over his successful saving of the universe, dubbing it the smartest thing he'd ever done.

In 2011, the Decepticons invaded Cybertron in full force. Grimlock was deployed by Wreck-Gar to fend off the invaders. He was seen fighting alongside his fellow Dinobots as well as the Throttlebots against the invading Decepticons, however, they didn't fare too well against the Decepticon Headmasters, as they are all quickly put to sleep by Mindwipe's hypnosis attack. In the second episode, Grimlock was again in action, trying to protect Vector Sigma along with two fellow Dinobots and Jazz.

After the animated series ended in the US Grimlock appeared in animated form one last time in the commercial for the Classic Pretenders.

Books
Grimlock was featured in the 1985 Find Your Fate Junior book called Dinobots Strike Back by Casey Todd.

Grimlock appeared in the 1986 story and coloring book The Lost Treasure of Cybertron by Marvel Books.

Grimlock was featured in the 1993 Transformers: Generation 2 coloring book "Decepticon Madness" by Bud Simpson.

Comics

3H Enterprises
Although no Grimlock toy was made in the Transformers: Universe toy line, both Grimlock and his Transformers: Robots in Disguise counterpart appeared in the storyline.

The Autobots returning to Cybertron along with Blackarachnia and Silverbolt were then abducted via teleportation beams and taken to Unicron. Tap-Out, Transformers: Armada Megatron, Brawn, War Within Grimlock and Snarl were also abducted from various timelines (Transformers: Universe #1).

War Within Grimlock, Armada Megatron and Universe Optimus Primal are each transported to the Unicron world, where they eventually team up and fight Striker and Reptilion. Note, there is a small continuity error in that this story ends with Grimlock, Megatron and Primal standing over Reptilion, but issue #2 of the comic starts with them standing over Striker (2003 Botcon Voice Actor Play).

After the events of the Botcon 2003 voice actor play, Optimus Primal is able to use his spark telepathy to free Striker from Unicron's influence. Optimus Primal, Megatron and Grimlock help break free the slaves from various timelines which are held there and gets them to Cybertron (Transformers: Universe #2).

Condor Verlag
In a story called "By their Blasters you shall know them ...!" from Transformers Comic-Magazine issue #12 by German comic publisher Condor Verlag Optimus Prime instructs Backstreet, Bumblebee and Ruckus on how to identify Autobots from Decepticons in battle using the Ark's computer. Pretender Grimlock is one of those he displays to the Autobots. He is identified as a Decepticon.

Devil's Due Publishing
Grimlock also appeared in several of the G.I. Joe vs. the Transformers series from Devil's Due Publishing. In 2004 Grimlock was among the Autobots under the leadership Optimus Prime who attempted to take back the planet Cybertron from the Decepticon tyrant Shockwave. After an accident with the teleportational systems of the supercomputer Teletran-3, Grimlock found himself sent back in time and on the planet Earth. He was reformatted in the form of an Earth dinosaur with several other Autobots. A group of humans were able to bring the new Dinobots back to Cybertron and they helped overcome Shockwave.

Grimlock returned in the third series as a main character. Grimlock, Arcee, Bumblebee and Perceptor were sent to Earth to aid G.I. Joe in removing the influence of Cybertronian technology on the planet. When Cobra attacked the base, the Autobots helped repel the Cobra Battle Android Trooper armies. This was simply a distraction, however, to allow Cobra Commander access to the real prize - Serpent O.R., a technorganic android created from the DNA of many great warleaders and parts from Megatron. Predictably the Megatron aspects took control and Serpent O.R. escaped, taking over the G.I. Joe battlesuits and forcing Grimlock and the other Autobots to battle them while he made his escape. The Autobots and Joes pursued him to Cybertron, where they were captured by Serpentor, the Predacons, the Seacons and the Stunticons. While Serpentor captured Optimus Prime, Snake-Eyes led a jailbreak, with Grimlock flattening Rampage in the process. He would then form part of the combined Autobot/G.I. Joe strike force to rescue Optimus Prime, at one point ripping a Decepticon prisoner's arm off to gain Prime's location. At the end, after Serpentor's defeat and Prime's rescue, Grimlock admitted he was wrong about the Joes, and that they were great heroes, warriors and friends.

There is a notable disparity in Grimlock's speech patterns between the second and third series. In the second series he is seen to speak normally, referring to himself as "I". However, in the third series he speaks in his more normal "Me Grimlock" speech.

Dreamwave Productions
The 21st century re-imagining of the original universe by Dreamwave Productions depicted Grimlock in a manner similar to his depiction in Marvel Comics - a powerful, cunning warrior who values strength of body and character. Through Transformers: The War Within, the company shaped a background on Cybertron for Grimlock which showed that he had participated in the planet's underground gladiatorial game in order to unleash the rage and anger he had always overflowed with. When Megatron began using the games to identify suitable soldiers for his burgeoning Decepticon army, Grimlock was recruited by him and initially fought on his side, befriending Starscream and perhaps the scientist, Jetfire, before defecting to the Autobots - not out of any particular fondness for them and their ideals, but rather out of sheer hatred of Megatron and his ideals. He still bears a particularly fierce grudge against Jetfire over an unspecified incident with a cerebro-shell.

During the time Autobot leader Sentinel Prime was killed, Grimlock was an established, respected member of the Autobots (perhaps most remembered for his quote "Me Grimlock, badass!!!"). Grimlock questioned the new leadership of Optimus Prime, including Prime's first major decision to evacuate Cybertron over defending it. Witnessing and aiding him in battle with Megatron deep beneath Cybertron, however, Grimlock came to respect Prime as time passed. When Prime and Megatron disappeared in an early test of the experimental spacebridge transport system, disarray struck the Autobot and Decepticon ranks, and they splintered off into numerous smaller factions - Grimlock founded the Lightning Strike Coalition to fight the battles he considered the most important.

As the "Dark Ages" came to an end, Ultra Magnus reunified the various Autobot factions, with Grimlock becoming something of his right-hand man. Starscream's Predacon faction attacked an attempted peace treaty between the Autobots, the Decepticons and Ratbat's Ultracons. As Grimlock leapt to Ultra Magnus's defence, he apparently perished - naturally, we know he later returned to life, but unfortunately, due to Dreamwave's closure, this story was never resolved, and Grimlock's restoration to life was left unexplained.

What is known of the remainder of his time on Cybertron, however, is that he, Slag, Sludge, Snarl, and Swoop formed a team known as the "Dynobots" (they are referred to as such in the first issue of "The Age of Wrath"). The Dynobots remained on Cybertron when Optimus Prime left on The Ark, pursued by Megatron. When Optimus Prime and Megatron's troops vanished four million years ago, they pursued the Decepticons known as the Insecticons, who had set off in search of the missing leaders. The two teams battled on prehistoric Earth, and the battle ended with both sides trapped in stasis. The eventual awakening of Prime and Megatron's forces in 1984 was followed by the Autobots' discovery and reactivation of the Dynobots, now rechristened the "Dinobots" for their new dinosaur alternate modes.

When the Transformers were all believed destroyed in the explosion of the ship that was taking them back to Cybertron, several of them, including Grimlock, were recovered by a rogue military faction and reprogrammed so that they could be operating as killing machines. Bumblebee, Frenzy, Grimlock, Laserbeak, Prowl, Ravage, Soundwave and Starscream were forced to attack the Smitco oil refinery in the Arctic to display their power for sale to the highest bidder.

When Megatron liberated himself and several others from this control, Grimlock, tired of risking his life for the humans, joined him, ripping off his insignia and joining in the Decepticon attack on San Francisco, during which he was dispatched from behind by Trailbreaker. Left behind by the fleeing Decepticons, he subsequently located and liberated the other Dinobots, and headed for Cybertron. In the four-million-year interim, the planet had been unified by Shockwave for his own sinister ends, but once there, Grimlock led an assault on Iacon, providing enough chaos and unrest for Optimus Prime's Autobot underground to overthrow Shockwave's rule of Cybertron. Grimlock successfully hauled Optimus Prime and Ultra Magnus to safety when Shockwave's citadel exploded.

Grimlock's Pretender form is given an entry in the seventh issue of the More Than Meets the Eyes profile series, indicating there may have been plans to make him a Pretender at some point in the Dreamwave universe.

Dreamwave's closure meant that they would tell no further stories of their Grimlock, although his "War Within"-era design did appear in the Transformers: Universe comic book exclusive to BotCon.

Grimlock also appeared in the Dreamwave Transformers/G.I. Joe comic. Although not one of the Dinobots in this continuity, transforming into a Sherman Tank, this Grimlock shared the rebellious attitude and speech mannerisms of other incarnations of the G1 character, although he had a softer attitude towards humans. Reactivated by G.I. Joe to fight the Decepticons and Cobra, Grimlock battled Cobra forces and Rumble alongside Roadblock, although the Decepticon's piledriver arms nearly defeated them, with Grimlock telling Roadblock to leave him, until Bumblebee and Scarlett intervened. When Snake Eyes opened the Matrix on Prime's command, Grimlock was presumably deactivated.

Fun Publications

Classicverse
Based on the Transformers Classic toy line, the Timelines 2007 story is set 15 years after the end of the Marvel Comics story (ignoring all events of the Marvel UK and Generation 2 comics).

When Bludgeon and his Decepticons were banished after the battle of Klo Grimlock refitted his Decepticon battleship, the Graviton, with weapons and recruited his several Dinobots and Autobots to hunt them down. The crew included Ultra Magnus, Springer, Huffer, Elita One, Snarl, Terranotron and the Mini-Cons Swoop and Strongarm. After getting word from Optimus Prime that Megatron was alive on Earth Grimlock left Ultra Magnus in charge of the Graviton and took a shuttle to Earth.

In the story Crossing Over by Fun Publications Grimlock was among Autobot troops of Optimus Prime who responded to the sighting of Megatron and arrived in time to save the dimensional traveling Autobot Skyfall from Megatron's wraith.

In Games of Deception the Graviton follows Bludgeon's agent Bugbite and several Decepticons to Earth where the Autobots join up with Grimlock. After a brief encounter with the Decepticons the Graviton leaves with Grimlock joining them.

Classic Grimlock's biography was featured in issue #13 of the Transformers Collectors Club magazine.

Grimlock appears in "Beast Wars Shattered Glass Chapter One: Shattered Time" by Fun Publications. In this story Ultra Magnus and the Autobots aboard the Graviton battle Megatron and the Decepticons aboard the Talon. Both ships are pulled through a vortex into the past of Shattered Glass Earth. Crashing they discover that dangerous energon readings outside the ship will place them in stasis lock. The Autobots devise organic alternate modes to protect them from the energon. The Decepticons create energon-absorbing armor for protection. Grimlock takes on the alternate form of a white velociraptor (his Beast Wars toy). This team of animal-based Autobots eventually renamed themselves "Maximals" after encountering a member of that faction from an alternate universe.

Grimlock and his fellow Maximals eventually joined forces with the heroic Decepticons-as opposed to their Megatron's renamed Predacons-under Galvatron. This would lead to Grimlock joining Galvatron in coming to the aid of Decepticon City on Earth when it was attacked by the Autobots in an effort to break the Decepticon war effort once and for all. Grimlock would be sent in to attack Superion, only to be overpowered after letting his guard down due to the humor-in his eyes, at least-of a Combiner made up of Micromasters. Fortunately, the Micromaster Predacons came to his aid and thwarted Superion's assault.

Wings Universe
Kup told the Dinobots and Rodimus the story of how he became a member of the Autobot Elite Guard.

Beast Wars: Uprising
Grimlock was also featured in the Beast Wars: Uprising storyline as a member of the Maximal-Predacon resistance movement instigated by Lio Convoy. Having transplanted his Spark into a Maximal protoform to avoid the immobility common among his fellow Autobot and Decepticon "Builders," Grimlock launches a violent campaign seeking to topple the old regime and bring Cybertron under resistance rule. However, his extreme agenda eventually leads him to steal the G-Virus, a contagion born from the essence of the fallen Galvatron with the ability to remake any Cybertronian in his image. Grimlock soon leads his team to a gladitorial event, intent on unleashing the virus on the spectators, only to have the now Micromaster Hot Rod interfere. One of Grimlock's own subordinates then destroys most of the virus, unaware that a Cybertronian has already been affected and been turned into a new Galvatron.

IDW Publishing
In a flashback in Maximum Dinobots #1 Grimlock lead the Dinobots in taking a Decepticon energon silo in Sub-Sector Nine on Cybertron.

In the Transformers Spotlight issue on Shockwave, Grimlock and the 'Dinobots' (sporting Cybertronian designs much like their War Within designs) appear in a story that partially pays homage to their Marvel G1 origin. Seeking payback for a humiliating defeat by Shockwave, Grimlock pursued him to prehistoric Earth (which Shockwave was seeding with Energon). In order to protect themselves against Energon surges, the Dinobots required alternate modes covered by a layer of synthetic flesh. Refusing to pick dying and thus weak Ice Age mammals for an alternate form, Grimlock chose to utilise more ferocious dinosaurian beast modes which were much more impressive. The Dinobots got the initial jump on Shockwave, as their attack was too illogical for him to understand, but he quickly recovered and dispatched the entire team, destroying their synthetic skins and sending them into stasis lock. Grimlock got the final laugh, as the Dinobot ship fired a pre-programmed blast into the surrounding volcanoes to unleash a flow of lava that engulfs all six Transformers until they were uncovered by human paleontologists in 2006.

Following this, Skywatch, a government agency who knew about Transformers, took over the site. Later, following escalating Transformer activity on Earth (as seen in The Transformers: Devastation), and losing control of their other captive Transformers Ravage and Laserbeak, Skywatch reactivated Grimlock as a response. The reawakening was sabotaged by the Machination, and Grimlock escaped. He met Scorponok, who proposed an alliance as they were both now fugitives. Grimlock refused, but lost the subsequent battle, teleporting himself to the Dinobot ship. Vowing to bring down Scorponok, he was unaware the Machination were manipulating Skywatch into reactivating the other Dinobots, with the aim of having them dispose of Grimlock (Spotlight Grimlock). In a following comic book title, Maximum Dinobots, Grimlock is still in his ship, planning his next move,  where he is attacked by Sunstreaker looking transformer headmasters. A few days later, Grimlock tries to bring Scorponok to him, only to be encountered by his Dinobot allies, and is forced to face them, the rest of the Dinobots are freed by unknown means (Scorponok unknown to any of them) and berate their leader of activating a last resort attack behind their back, Grimlock watches as his friends, his brothers somewhat leave, but then they are forced to fight together again when Scorponok sends more headmaster machines after the Dinobot. Eventually the Dinobots encountered Hot Rod, Hunter, Sunstreaker, and discover Scorponok's base of operations, they disable his army, by shutting down sunstreaker who was connected to numerous wires in head. In response, Scorponok kills Sludge, leaving a horrified Grimlock to drop his sword and tend his fallen friend, not only that but Shockwave who was also under Skywatch captivity is faces against Scorponok and later Grimlock. Grimlock on the other hand attempted a spark infusion via shock punches, but to no avail, Grimlock faces against a victorious Shockwave who defeats Scorponok with ease, the battle with Grimlock and Shockwave was actually meant to be a distraction, as Soundwave who was also on earth (Spotlight Soundwave) and was freed around this time. Instead Grimlock once again plays gamble and decides to end the fight by activating a Grenade that somewhat rendered them both in stasis. In the epilogue of Maximum Dinobots, Ultra Magnus had arrived to the scene and imprisoned Scorponok, Shockwave and Grimlock, however for his actions and good deeds on earth, Magnus attempted to make bail for Grimlock. However the former dinobot refuses, as he only cared for his teammates safety, and in exchange Ultra Magnus cancels any arresting attempts or warrants on Slag, Sludge, Snarl and Swoop. Grimlock is taken to Garrius-9, autobot super max prison facility.

Following their acquisition of the Transformers licence in 2005 IDW Publishing released a comic book series which takes place during the Beast Wars animated series, but features the toys and characters who did not appear in the show itself. The Beast Wars incarnation of Grimlock appeared, as a gigantic white Velociraptor-type dinosaur, and it was revealed that Grimlock was among those in protoform stasis on the Axalon, and like the others was launched into space in the series pilot. He fought against Predacon leader Magmatron in a one-on-one battle but lost the upper hand when Magmatron split into three separate beast forms, which attacked him simultaneously; in the long run however, he provided the necessary distraction for the Maximals to steal Magmatron's Chronal Phase armband, leading to his ultimate defeat. Grimlock has since joined Razorbeast's Maximal team. After the defeat of Magmatron's Predacons the united group of Maximals awaited rescue from Cybertron.

He appears among the Maximals on the cover of the first issue of the sequel story Beast Wars: The Ascending. In the beginning of Beast Wars The Ascending Razorbeast speaks to Prowl and Wolfang about how he feels there is no rescue mission coming for them from Cybertron as Grimlock hunts in the nearby woods. In Beast Wars: The Ascending #4 Grimlock was among the Maximals and Predacons returned to Cybertron to battle Shokaract.

Grimlock had a biography printed in the Beast Wars Sourcebook by IDW Publishing.

Dawn of the Predacus
Grimlock also features briefly in the comic story "Dawn of the Predacus" in which his exposure to transmatter turns him into a protoform, heralding his eventual role in Beast Wars fiction. As he is placed in a stasis pod, he is looked upon by Predacon-and future Maximal-Dinobot, possibly indicating where the warrior took his future name.

Manga
In the Japanese manga "Big War" #2, the Autobots Rodimus Prime, Grimlock, Kup and Wheelie, along with their human allies Spike Witwicky and Daniel Witwicky send Computron into battle against Galvatron's new warrior combiner Abominus. The Terrorcons spit "corrosive control liquid" against Computron, taking control of him and turning him into a Decepticon. Spike luckily uses his new Exosuit to free Computron with "defense spray". Defeated, Galvatron retreats.

Marvel Comics
Since Marvel Comics' Transformers series were primarily written by Bob Budiansky in its early years, the writer was able to present his origin for the Dinobots as he had originally conceived it. Hence, when the Ark crashed on Earth four million years ago, it was followed down to the planet by the Decepticon Shockwave, who touched down in the prehistoric region of Antarctica known as the Savage Land. The Ark's computer detected his presence on the planet, and its scans of the Savage Land led it to believe that dinosaurs were the dominant life form. Thus, it reconstructed Grimlock and his troops into dinosaur forms, in order to battle Shockwave. Unfortunately, he slyly outmaneuvered them and managed to pick them off at a distance with his superior firepower, knocking them into a tar pit one by one. With their final strike the battle ended in a stalemate as the Dinobots made him fall in the pit along with them, buried under a rock slide for several million years.

In 1984, when Shockwave was accidentally reactivated by an Autobot probe and took command of the Decepticons from Megatron, Autobot medic Ratchet entered into an uneasy alliance with the deposed Decepticon leader, agreeing to recover the Dinobots so that they might defeat Shockwave again. Ratchet pulled a double-cross, however, and had the Dinobots attack Megatron instead, resulting in a battle that ended with Megatron's disappearance.

Grimlock steadily grew more and more displeased with Optimus Prime's leadership, and eventually broke his Dinobots away from the main Autobot faction. After a prolonged period living in self-imposed exile, the news of Optimus Prime's death brought Grimlock back to the Autobots. After proving his worth by defeating the Decepticon Trypticon, Grimlock was elected leader of the Autobots.

It soon proved that people with power, especially a lot of power, are more likely to be corrupt. Grimlock became a tyrannical ruler who led the Autobots with an iron fist. His policy towards Earth and its inhabitants were vastly different from Optimus Prime's – instead of viewing them as objects of protection, Grimlock expressed a disdain for humanity, viewing them as an inferior species unworthy of their protection. Under Grimlock's leadership, the Ark was repaired and made space-worthy again.

In issue #32, titled "Used Autobots", Wheeljack completed work on his Geothermal Generator, which used the heat from the volcano the Ark had crashed in to generate energon cubes. Although Wheeljack thought this would impress Grimlock by reducing their dependence on human help, Grimlock seemed to think the Autobots should just take what they need from the humans.

Blaster and Goldbug could not endure Grimlock's leadership anymore, and set out on their own, only to have Grimlock mark them as traitors. Blaster was hunted down by the Protectobots and later the Dinobots themselves, and placed under imprisonment and torture.

When the Autobot Headmasters and Targetmasters arrived from Nebulos, Grimlock refused to recognize the authority of Fortress Maximus and failed to establish an allegiance with his group. This proved to be the last straw for the Autobots under Grimlock's command, who collectively conspired to overthrow him, arranging for Blaster to challenge Grimlock for leadership. During their battle on the moon, the Decepticons took advantage of this weakness in the Autobot ranks and interrupted the duel with an all-out assault. With all Autobots now under attack from their mortal enemies, Grimlock and Blaster put their differences aside and fought alongside each other against the Decepticon horde. Subsequently, Fortress Maximus orchestrated the recreation of Optimus Prime as a Powermaster, and Grimlock stepped down as leader.

Grimlock and the Dinobots were destroyed during the battle against Starscream while the villain was super-powered by the Underbase.

Grimlock was seen among the Autobots being repaired on the Ark when Optimus Prime sent Landmine and Cloudburst on their mission to obtain computer chips to repair fellow Autobots in issue #52, "Guess Who The Mechannibals Are Having For Dinner?"

Grimlock's body was seen among the deactivated Autobots Ratchet was doing his best to revive in Transformers #56, "Back from the Dead".

After a short time, Grimlock (along with Jazz and Bumblebee) was rebuilt by Ratchet as a Pretender. Ratchet shortly after was lost in a transport incident while taking out Megatron, and was thus unable to continue his work restoring other Autobots in stasis lock (Ratchet later returned, physically merged with Megatron). Grimlock swore to one day find a way to revive his Dinobots.

Under the leadership of Powermaster Optimus Prime, Grimlock proved to be a loyal and powerful Autobot, daring even to battle the Matrix-powered Decepticon Thunderwing during the Matrix Quest. However, he was still obsessed with quickly reviving the Dinobots, a goal which put him at odds with Optimus Prime, who advocated patience in the search for a way to rebuild the fallen Autobots. Grimlock finally lost patience, stole the bodies of the Dinobots and a shuttle from the Ark, and piloted it to the planet Hydrus Four, where scientists had developed a new fuel called nucleon. It was more powerful than energon and capable of bringing dead Transformers back to life, but it was unstable and could have unforeseen consequences. Grimlock was unwilling to subject his Dinobots to anything he would not go through himself, and thus decided to test the fuel on himself first. When no ill effects were apparent, he used it to revive the Dinobots, and brought enough back to revive the remaining fallen Autobots.

The Dinobots returned to Cybertron with the nucleon, and arrived in time for the battle with Unicron. Their arrival, and their reviving the fallen Autobots with Nucleon, was an important part of Transformer victory that day, but Optimus Prime once again lost his life, sacrificing himself to destroy Unicron, and once again naming Grimlock as his successor with his dying breath.

Before Grimlock could celebrate his new position, however, the Nucleon's effect on Transformers became apparent. Grimlock began to experience brief bursts of immobility, his joints locking, which reached a peak when he became completely paralyzed in Cybertron's wastelands while he and the Dinobots were under attack by monstrous creatures from beneath Cybertron's surface. Realizing that Grimlock had become trapped in a "chrysalis" stage, Prime's Powermaster partner, Hi-Q, tapped into and accelerated the process, completing Grimlock's evolution into a more powerful "Actionmaster" – but the enhanced power came with a price: Grimlock was now no longer able to transform into dinosaur mode.

At that point, Cybertron was believed to be dying as a result of the battle with Unicron, and the Autobots and Decepticons were co-operating to evacuate. However, the Decepticons had a hidden motive: to escape, and leave the Autobots marooned on the dying planet. Grimlock and the Dinobots were the only ones among the Autobots who saw through the Decepticons' false pretense of peaceful co-existence and suspected the plan of mass betrayal. When the Decepticons sabotaged the Autobots' ships and fled the planet, Grimlock saved the Autobots. He revealed that he had captured Decepticon ships after a strike against them before the voyage to Earth, and had hidden them away. Thanks to those ships, the Autobots were able to flee Cybertron and follow the Decepticons to the planet Klo for a final showdown. Unfortunately, Decepticon leader Bludgeon had discovered the Autobot homing beacon and laid a trap for them. Grimlock's stubbornness meant the Autobots walked right into it, decimating them. Grimlock was one of the few survivors, and when Optimus Prime returned, recreated by the Last Autobot, Grimlock participated in the rout of the Decepticons.

While the monthly Transformers comic was published in the United States, its sister title in the United Kingdom reprinted its stories, and included many of its own original tales, interspliced with the running American narrative. The author of these stories, Simon Furman, was particularly fond of Grimlock, often using him for his original stories, and even using the character for responses on the readers' letters page. Furman truly transformed Grimlock, from the brutish tyrant of the early American comics into a noble anti-hero.

Set in and around the U.S. stories, Grimlock and the Dinobots were the stars of several stories while self-exiled from the other Autobots, including In The National Interest where they tried to help expose the Robo-Master hoax. When leader of the Autobots, Grimlock was involved in assisting Action Force battle Megatron in London and attempted to kill the Predacon Divebomb in order to silence embarrassing facts about Swoop's past.

Towards the end of the series, the UK comics began a break-away storyline that branched off from the continuity of the American stories, beginning with Grimlock's decision to once again break his Dinobots away from the main Autobot force. Tired of Prime's pacifistic approach to protecting Earth, Grimlock was joined by several older Autobots like Prowl and Wheeljack, who had just recently been reactivated, and longed for the older, simpler days. Under Grimlock's command, they formed the Earthforce, a pro-active Autobot group based in Canada who regularly battled the two Decepticon forces under the commands of Megatron and Shockwave.

Issue #279 of the Marvel U.K. Transformers comic featured a story called "Divide and Conquer!" where Soundwave lead the bulk of the Decepticon forces on Earth against the Autobot Earthforce headquarters while Starscream attacked an oil tanker. Sent into battle by Prowl, the Dinobots routed the main Decepticon forces while Springer lead the Autobot Survivors, Broadside, Inferno, Skids, and Carnivac to defeat Starscream.

There was no specific ending for the Earthforce crew, but the issue of nucleon was resolved in a one-shot text story contained in the final Transformers annual (a hardback book containing new material released each year). Of the Dinobots, only Slag retained the ability to transform, until the discovery of new nucleon allowed all the Transformers previously empowered by it to regain their transforming abilities. The place in continuity of this tale is hard to determine. It followed on from the events at the conclusion of the American series, yet cannot fit in with American continuity as it puts Megatron in a situation he cannot possibly be in.

A few years after the conclusion of the original Transformers comic, the line was given a shot in the arm with the release of the new Transformers: Generation 2 toyline and an accompanying comic. Grimlock's toy was re-released for the G2 toyline in several colors including blue, but he continued to appear in his original grey color scheme for most of his appearances in the G2 comic.

With his transformation capabilities restored (the explanation for which was not offered in the American series), Grimlock was Optimus Prime's second in command in the so-called Generation 2 series, aiding in the Autobots' war against the "second generation" of Cybertronians led by Jhiaxus. However, he remained as rebellious and aggressive as ever, though it proved to be a mixed blessing - at one point his urge to combat Jhiaxus's forces led him and his troops right into a trap, while at another time, his willingness to defy Optimus Prime's orders and launch an all-out attack saved Prime from certain death at the hands of Megatron. When the Autobots and Decepticons united against Jhiaxus and the threat of the Swarm - a destructive by-product of Transformer reproduction - Grimlock was the joint leader of the ground troops as Prime and Megatron fought on other fronts, and survived the brutal conflict.

Grimlock appeared in his blue Generation 2 form in the short lived UK. Generation 2 comic series.

TFcon comics
Grimlock appears in the TFcon 2008 voice play prelude comic called "Ground Effects" where Perceptor informs him about a repeat repeat wave. Grimlock orders the other Dinobots to dig up a Transformer on Dinobot Island.

Grimlock appeared in the TFcon 2008 voice play "Primitive Recall."

Games
The Classic line appeared in a simple Flash-based video game on the Hasbro web site called Transformers Battle Circuit. In this one-on-one fighting game, you press the right and left arrow keys to try to overpower your opponent. In the game you can play Rodimus, Bumblebee, Grimlock, Jetfire, Starscream, Astrotrain, Trypticon or Menasor. Optimus Prime and Megatron each appear as the boss you must defeat to win the game.

Other media
Grimlock is featured in the webcomic Twisted Kaiju Theater.

Grimlock appears as a play on the word gridlock in the popular webcomic Least I Could Do.

Grimlock is portrayed as Hal the Boomerang Bird in Angry Birds Transformers. This version is not a humanoid who can change into a tyrannosaurus, but rather is a Tyrannosaurus who can change into a motorcycle.

Toys
 Generation 1 Dinobot Grimlock (1985)
Grimlock's toy was originally part of Takara's Diaclone Dinosaur Robo series. When Hasbro imported the toy in 1985 for the Transformers line, the blue crotch was changed to red and the Diaclone driver mini-figure was dropped.
The original Grimlock changes from a robot into a robotic T. rex and comes with a red sword, a black double-barreled rifle, and a rocket launcher with three silver rockets.
Grimlock was later reissued in the European/Australian-exclusive Classics series (not to be confused with the 2006 Classics line).
A variety of knockoff toys of Grimlock have been produced, including those with gold chrome, large horns on the head, and those remolded to look like Mechagodzilla.
According to X-Entertainment Grimlock was the 2nd top Transformers figure of all time.
 Generation 1 Decoy Grimlock (1986)
A small rubber version of Grimlock holding his rifle in robot mode given away as a bonus item with Transformers in 1986.
 Generation 1 Pretender Grimlock (1989)
A small Grimlock toy which could be stored inside a human-like shell.
 Generation 1 Legends Grimlock (1989)
Basically Pretender Grimlock without the shell, helmet and with only his tail gun. A Kmart store exclusive. Knockoffs of this toy in bright orange and red colors have been produced.
 Generation 1 Action Master Grimlock (1990)
A non-transforming Action Master toy with an anti-tank cannon which turns into a long-range mortar launcher.
 Generation 2 Grimlock (1993)
Based on the original Grimlock without his missile launcher. This figure was available in blue, gray or turquoise.
 Beast Wars Grimlock (1997)
A recolor of the original Dinobot. Comes with sword and rotating blade. The Dinobot mold was changed slightly for this release. The chest area underneath the Velociraptor head in robot mode was made up of bone-like detailing on Dinobot. However, in the center of all this detail, Grimlock has a square section that was molded to accommodate the Maximal heat sensitive rub sticker. Slightly smaller knockoffs of this toy have been sold under the Animism Defenders toy line.
Beast Wars Grimlock (himself a recolor of Beast Wars Dinobot) was remolded in silver and orange to appear more cybernetic as Thrustor for the Japanese-exclusive Beast Wars Second line. Later, for Beast Wars Neo, the toy was remolded to become Hardhead, a blue and purple Pachycephalosaurus, and this version of the figure was redecoed in yellow, black and green and released in the Beast Machines Dinobots subline as Dinotron. After being released under the Grimlock name again in 2003, the original version of the mold returned to its roots when it was redecoed into the 10th Anniversary edition figure of Beast Wars Dinobot.
 World Smallest Dinorobots Commander (2004)
An unlicensed smaller reproduction of the Generation 1 figure by JustiToys, in the style of Takara's Smallest Transformers.
 Dinobots Grimlock (2003)
A Walmart exclusive redeco of Beast Wars Grimlock that came packaged with a Terrorsaur redeco named both Swoop and Terranotron.
 Alternators Grimlock (2005)
Grimlock staged a comeback in 2005 as part of the Transformers: Alternators toyline, known in Japan as "Binaltech". Although the American toys offer no supporting fiction, the Binaltech series tells the story of how Grimlock was reborn in his new form.
While the Autobots on Earth were decimated by Cosmic Rust and restored in new "Binaltech" bodies through a joint partnership with human automotive corporations, Grimlock and the Dinobots were a part of the larger war raging in space. Unfortunately, Megatron struck at their primitive minds with telepathic alien lifeforms known as "Unleashers," which drove them to attack their fellow Autobots; with no other options, the Autobots were forced to counterattack, taking the Dinobots out of commission. Grimlock regained consciousness and vowed to do anything to return to the battle, and was consequently transported to Earth. His spark was implanted into the Autobots' newest Binaltech body, which combined all the aspects of the previous bodies. Now able to transform into a Ford Mustang GT, Grimlock immediately resented his new, non-traditional body, but came to make the best of it. He remains armed with his energo-sword, and also wields a stun laser.
The figure was also redecoed in white and blue with a different head as Wheeljack.
 Titanium 3-inch Grimlock (2006)
Grimlock was released as a 3 inch tall non-transforming toy in the Transformers: Titanium line.
Mightiest among the Dinobots, Grimlock masked a surprising intelligence behind simplistic speech patterns. His contempt for the weak kept him often at odds with Optimus Prime, but his hatred for all those who exploited their strength at the expense of others kept him always firmly on the side of right. Though he could bring a huge array of weapons to any fight, he preferred to close with his enemies, wielding his Energo sword in robot mode, or simply crushing his enemies' limbs with his powerful jaw as a Tyrannosaurus.
 Classics Grimlock (2006)
The original Grimlock returned to his original T. rex Beast mode in the Transformers Classics line, released in December 2006. He returns as leader of the Dinobots, in a toy that is a homage to his original and pretender releases, but with a totally new mold and for the first time, a flexible articulated tail. His fiction seems more in-tune with his The War Within persona, faking his impediment to trick his enemies, as well as collecting pieces of his opponents left over after battles to add to an ever-growing collection. Classics Grimlock represents modern research regarding the T. rex, with a horizontal back and tail carried high, rather than the classic sloped back and ground-dragging tail.
Initially sold separately, Classic Jetfire and Grimlock were later packaged in a 2-pack box set.
This toy was redecoed into BotCon exclusive Overkill (2007) and Shattered Glass Grimlock (2008).
This toy was voted the 73rd top toy released in the last 10 years by Toyfare Magazine.
 Attacktix Grimlock (2007)
Series 2 of the Transformers Attacktix figures included a Generation 1 Grimlock figure in beast mode.
 Transformers 3D Battle-Card Game Grimlock (2007)
Produced by Wizards of the Coast, wave 2 of their Transformers 3D Battle-Card Game included a Grimlock card.
 Titanium 6-inch War Within Grimlock (2007)
At BotCon 2006, Hasbro announced that a figure based on Grimlock from his "War Within" comic book appearance is "on the rollout line" for the 6 inch metal Cybertron Heroes lineup. No further details have been revealed about this newest Grimlock yet (released as a Toys "R" Us (2008) exclusive along with War Within Prowl).
 Henkei! Henkei! C-03 Deluxe Grimlock (2008)
The Japanese version of the Classics Deluxe figure by Takara Tomy sports chrome silver and gold parts in place of the metallic paint applications of the Hasbro version.
 Masterpiece MP-08 12-inch Grimlock (2009)
In March 2009, Takara released a Masterpiece-series Grimlock in his robotic and dinosaur form. The figure is highly articulated, comparable to the other masterpiece transformers. This figure also has eyes that can be switched between red (the original toy color) and blue (the animated series color) in both robot and T. Rex modes. It makes no sounds, but does have a light-up blaster and sword. Other accessories include an attachable brain transfer device (as seen in the episode "Grimlock's New Brain", where he transferred his newly acquired intelligence to his creation, Computron), a bowtie, an apron and a cocktail tray (used by Grimlock in "Madman's Paradise" as a waiter during an alien ambassador's meeting on Cybertron). This figure is a breath of fresh air for the Masterpiece line, in the sense that the transformation is not as complicated as the other Masterpieces, which is almost similar to that of the original G1 figure.
 Masterpiece MP08X King Grimlock (2009)
A Toy Hobby (Japan) exclusive that includes the crown, sword, and gun. The box packaging features the cover of the Marvel Comics issue where Grimlock was proclaimed king.
 Device Label Grimlock (2009)
An optical mouse that transforms into Grimlock's dinosaur mode.
Also available in a purple redeco as Dinosaurer/Trypticon.iGear IG-TF003 MP-08 Upgrade Set (2009)
An unlicensed set of accessories for Masterpiece Grimlock made by iGear. This set includes a crown, a mug and small, non-transforming version of Thrust in jet mode.
 Masterpiece Grimlock (2010)
The Toys "R" Us U.S. exclusive release of Masterpiece Grimlock differs slightly from the Japanese version. More colors have been added on some parts of the figure. The teeth and claws on dinosaur mode are not as sharp as those on the Japanese version. Only the sword (which is molded in clear white instead of clear orange), gun and crown come as accessories.
 Studio Series '86 #06 Grimlock (2021) - A new and updated version of the character with a G1 inspired look.Transformers Kingdom War For Cybertron: Battle Across Time  (2021) - Beast Wars Grimlock is featured as a redeco of the Kingdom Dinobot toy, and comes packaged with an Earth mode Mirage.

Other merchandise
Optimus Prime, Ironhide and Grimlock are the three Autobot figures available to play in the Monopoly Transformers Collectors Edition game.

Transformers: Robots in Disguise

The first completely different character to bear the name of Grimlock was one inhabiting the alternate universe of the 2001 Transformers toyline, Transformers: Robots in Disguise.

Grimlock (originally named Build Hurricane in the original Japanese version of the series, Car Robots) was a co-leader of the Autobot Build Team, able to transform into a steam shovel. Despite his harsh appearance, Grimlock is a seasoned, upbeat warrior. He judges any situation in a composed, calm manner, and dispenses accurate advice based on his many past experiences in battle to others, particularly his leader, Wedge. He can combine with his fellow Build Team members to create Landfill, able to form either a leg or a pair of arms.

Animated series
Grimlock first appeared in episode #18 "Wedge's Short Fuse" and last appeared in episode #38 "The Final Battle Part 2".

3H Enterprises
Robots in Disguise Grimlock (in Walmart yellow repaint colors) appeared in the 2004 BotCon voice actor play.

Play Synopsis: Rhinox has built a device to deflect Unicron's attempts to pull victims from other dimensions with his tractor beam. The Autobots deflect two attempts and the victims end up on a frozen planetoid instead of with Unicron. Maximals Rattrap and Silverbolt and the Predacon Waspinator are sent to help the victims, but Reptilion, Sunstorm, Ruination, and Universe Perceptor are sent to get them for Unicron. As a side effect of the device Rhinox built, a vortex opens which sucks in an Autobot shuttle from the past piloted by Bumblebee, Tracks, and Cosmos. Thrust attacks the Maximal ship, but they are saved by being transported to the Autobot shuttle. The Autobots and Maximals then go to the planet where they save the victims from the Decepticons. On the planet are two groups of Autobots. One is from the Robots in Disguise story, with Landfill (Walmart recolor), Universe Side Burn, and Universe Prowl. The other is from another parallel world with Spy Changer Optimus Prime, Ultra Magnus, Prowl, and Ironhide. They all fight off the Decepticons. The Autobot shuttle is sent back to its own time.

Toys
 Car Robots Build Hurricane (2000)
Grimlock's first toy is actually Japan's Build Hurricane, part of its Transformers: Car Robots line in 2000.
 Robots in Disguise Grimlock (2001)
When Grimlock (the American equivalent) was released in 2001, mold and paint colors were slightly altered. The most noticeable differences are the lack of metallic elements used on the Build Team's American bodies, and the tampographing of Autobot insignias on each Build Team member. (Previously, only Build Boy/Wedge carried an insignia.)
Grimlock and the rest of the Build Team were redecoed for Transformers: Universe as the Constructicons, in the characters' traditional purple and green color scheme. Grimlock became Scavenger, packaged with Hightower.
 Robots in Disguise Grimlock Redeco (2003)
Grimlock was later recolored in yellow by Hasbro in 2003 for a Wal*Mart store exclusive and was packaged with his team. Although packages as part of Robots in Disguise many fans consider it to be an unofficial part of the "Transformers: Universe" toyline by being released during the Universe time period. It is the last released toy of the RiD series before it was changed to Universe. This version of the Build Team appeared in the Transformers: Universe storyline presented at the BotCon 2005 voice actor play.

Transformers: Energon

Another alternate-universe incarnation of Grimlock entered the fray in the Transformers: Energon line. Grimlock's toy – packaged with the similarly redesigned Swoop – was a modern updating of his original figure. It still transformed into a Tyrannosaurus rex, but had one major change: Grimlock and Swoop could now combine to form a larger robot named "Mega-Dinobot". The characters' joint biography clearly draws on the Generation 1 cartoon incarnation of the original characters, presenting them as Autobots who are simple in speech and thought, but who make up for it in raw strength. Decepticons have been known to flee in fear when faced with the two Dinobots, as Swoop uses his aerial abilities to confuse and distract them, while Grimlock attacks from behind and stomps them flat before they know what hit them. Though heavily armed, the duo's preferred weaponry is their teeth and talons.

Dreamwave Productions
It comes as no surprise that longtime Grimlock fan Simon Furman intended to feature the characters in Dreamwave's Energon comic book, but the company's closure prevented this.

Fun Publications
Grimlock appeared in the text story from Fun Publications called "Force of Habit". This story explained where he was during the events of the Cybertron story. Ultra Magnus was the commander of various Autobot ships sent to other planets in search for the Cyber Planet Keys. He also served as captain of the Iron Hope which was crewed by Bonecrusher, Grimlock, Ironhide, Knock Out, Overcast, Prowl, Quickstrike, RipTide, Skyblast, Smokescreen, Swoop, Wreckage, and the Sky Scorcher Mini-Con Team. Grimlock and Swoop were sent to stop an attack by Predacon on the ship.

Toys
 Energon Grimlock with Swoop (2005)

Transformers Cinematic Universe
  
Producer Tom DeSanto has stated that he had an idea on how to include the Dinobots and Constructicons in a possible sequel, although director Michael Bay has confirmed that they will not be. However, the Constructicons and their combined form, Devastator, do appear in the 2009 movie.

In a USA Today online fan poll, Grimlock was one of the 10 Transformers that the fans wanted in the sequel, tied for second with 16% of the votes.

Later reports revealed that Grimlock and other Dinobots would be featured in the fourth film, with images surfacing of Optimus Prime riding Grimlock into battle in Hong Kong.

Live-action films
In Transformers: Age of Extinction, Grimlock and the Dinobots are captured by Lockdown as trophies, referred to as legendary knights. After the Autobots escape with the part of the ship holding them, Optimus releases the Dinobots for backup and engages in a battle for dominance with Grimlock which Optimus wins. Submitting to Optimus, Grimlock allows Optimus to ride him into battle in Hong Kong and aids in destroying the KSI Decepticons and protecting the Seed. After Lockdown is defeated, Optimus releases Grimlock and the Dinobots to go their own way. This Grimlock is larger than previous incarnations and, like the rest of the Dinobots, he isn't referred to by name (although in The Last Knight he is named by Cade Yeager) as he cannot speak, or at least has yet to learn how.

Grimlock returned in Transformers: The Last Knight. Grimlock is among the Autobots taking sanctuary at Cade Yeager's junkyard. He has taken up the personality of a dog, often eating the local police chief's car. During the TRF and Decepticon invasion of the junkyard, Grimlock attacks a fleet of TRF cars along with Slug, eating the Decepticon Dreadbot. Though he is not seen after this, Grimlock presumably joins the other Autobots in returning to Cybertron on Lockdown's ship.

Mini-Grimlock, a baby Dinobot, also appears in the Last Knight, as one of the Autobots in Cade's junkyard. It gains Grimlock's fire breath, which it uses in Cade's trailer. Mini-Grimlock is seen snuggling with Izabella and around the other Autobots.

Video games
The Sector 7 viral marketing web site featured several videos recording supposed evidence of Transformers on Earth. These featured cameos by Generation 1 Transformers, including scenes of Grimlock destroying a construction site, as well as scenes of Kickback and Laserbeak being video taped by people accidentally, and a security video showing bits of a robot looking a lot like Generation 1 Bumblebee transforming in a parking garage.

Grimlock's Age of Extinction incarnation is a playable character in Transformers: Rise of the Dark Spark. In the earth story, he helps out Optimus, Bumblebee and Drift destroy Lockdown's mercenary grunts, and only makes growling and roar sounds in the main story. In gameplay, his controls are very identical to his counterpart in Transformers: Fall of Cybertron.

Grimlock is one of the main playable characters in Transformers: Devastation, and the only one who does not transform into a motor vehicle.

Toys
 Age of Extinction Cyberverse Grimlock (2014)
 Age of Extinction Chomp and Stomp Grimlock (2014)
A new transforming toy aimed at younger children.
 Age of Extinction Dinobot Sparker Optimus Prime and Grimlock (2014)
A non-transforming toy of Optimus Prime riding on Grimlock. Optimus Prime is a non-poseable figure with a long sword while Grimlock features pull-back action that activates sparks in its body.
 Age of Extinction Voyager Class Grimlock (2014)
A new Voyager Class mold of Grimlock. Features chomping mouth action at the push of a button in dinosaur mode.
 Age of Extinction Leader Class Grimlock (2014)
A new Leader Class mold of Grimlock. This Grimlock has a back plate that turns into a spiked shield, and a tail that turns into his dragontooth mace.
 Age of Extinction 12" Titan Champion Grimlock''' (2014)
A non-transforming figure of Grimlock with limited poseability.

Transformers: Animated

A character named Grimlock appears in Transformers: Animated, which began airing in 2007. He is similar to his animated Generation 1 incarnation in persona and form, but with his face modified with a feral look. His beast mode now looks more like how an actual Tyrannosaurus is thought to look and his roar sounds much like the T. Rexs roar from Jurassic Park. In robot mode, he wields a flaming battle sword and can breathe fire in beast mode. Grimlock is partnered with fellow Dinobots, Snarl and Swoop. He debuts in episode 6, "Blast From the Past". Grimlock acquired his name while the damaged Megatron's head was surveying the Dinobots at Prof. Isaac Sumdac's laboratory. Megatron said, "And without more substantial robotics for my own body, my prospects are grim, locked in this prison of a lab." He is also the only one of the Dinobots to talk and the first to transform into robot mode.

Animated series
In "Blast From the Past" the Autobots visit a dinosaur-themed amusement park where animatronic dinosaurs are on display, but Bulkhead accidentally breaks them. Professor Sumdac and Megatron rebuild the animatronic dinosaurs as technological wonders named the Dinobots, who go on a rampage under the Deception's influence until the attacks powered Sari's AllSpark key affecting Bumblebee and Ratchet's Electromagnetic blast against the Dinobots by making them conscious. Finding a way to control them, Megatron told Grimlock to attack the city by telling the Dinobots they are "fossil feeders" due to the way Earth vehicles are powered and that the Autobots are even worse. The Dinobots are lured away by the Autobots, with Prowl secretly placing them at the later named Dinobot Island in hopes that they'll live in peace. However, while expressing his rage at two birds defecating on him, Grimlock accidentally transforms to robot mode and finds his new form to his liking.

In a TFA short, "Bulkhead Plays with Grimlock", Bulkhead throws a tree for no reason. Then Grimlock catches it with his mouth, and brings it back to Bulkhead. Grimlock states he loves fetch and asks to play again. Apparently this is a contradiction to "Human Error Part 2" where he criticized Snarl for willing to become a pet to Scrapper.

The episode "Survival of the Fittest" marks his, as well as the rest of the Dinobots, official side change when they help defeat Meltdown, Cyrus "The Colossus" Rhodes, and Meltdown's experiments.

In "Megatron Rising" Pt. 1, Optimus Prime, Prowl, and Bulkhead try to get the Dinobots to help them fight the Decepticons, but they refused saying that robots are their enemies. Upon them being told that they are robots too, Grimlock and the other two Dinobots end up fighting each other.

In "The Elite Guard", Optimus Prime leads Ultra Magnus and Sentinel Prime to the downed ship on Dinobot Island when they run into Grimlock and the Dinobots. Despite Optimus' warnings, Sentinel Prime charged them and got defeated. Ultra Magnus repelled them with the lightning he summoned with his hammer.

In "A Fistful of Energon", Prowl and Bulkhead are sent to the island where the Dinobots are, once again, to investigate the reports of a rampage. Soon enough, Grimlock heads right towards Prowl and Bulkhead, thinking something has made him hostile, but later discovering something is wedged between his foot, and yank it out.

Later, under Blackarachnia's seduction, Grimlock returns in the episode "Black Friday" to break out Meltdown. Out of the Dinobots, Grimlock had the most love for Blackarachnia, refusing to accept that she's using him when she departs, leaving him heartbroken.

In "Predacons Rising" the Dinobots are once again coerced into doing Blackarachnia's bidding, bringing them into conflict with the Autobots. In the ensuing battle, they are overwhelmed and defeated by Jetfire and Jetstorm, though Jetfire noted Grimlock seemed to have some fight left in him.

During the Human Error 2-parter, Sari attempted to get the Dinobots' aid only to have a not so warm welcome. Though she managed to convince him not to attack with her techno-organic powers, Grimlock refuses to give the Autobots aid; however, he indirectly led her in looking for Snarl, whom he lost respect towards and considered a 'traitor' for befriending the marooned Scrapper.

Other media
Grimlock appears among the characters in Re-Unification, the 2010 TFCon voice actor play prelude comic.

Toys
 'Animated Voyager Grimlock (2008)
 Grimlock transforms into a mechanical Tyrannosaurus fairly accurate to his Animated appearance. He comes with a large, transparent orange sword with flame details that spring out when the sword is placed in his right hand and the wrist is twisted clockwise or counter-clockwise. A button on his dinosaur mode neck opens his mouth. The transformation sequence is very close to his original G1 toy, but with more details and a few minor steps added.
 The box packaging and instructions mention the sword also being able to connect to his mouth as a "Jet flame breath attack," though there are no actual connection points in his mouth. This feature was probably dropped during production due to issues with getting the sword to actually fit inside his mouth.
 Animated Activators Grimlock (2008)
A small version of Grimlock that transforms at the push of a button. First seen at San Diego Comic-Con International 2008.
Also bundled in Japan as part of the "Super Collection Vol. 2" gift set with Activators Bumblebee, Bulkhead (Ironhide in Japan) and Starscream.
 Animated Voyager Goldfire Grimlock (2009)
A metallic gold repaint of the Voyager Grimlock.
 Animated Activators Fireblast Grimlock (2009)
A redeco of the original Activators Grimlock. His paint job and design represents a volcano.
 Animated TA-17 Voyager Grimlock (Takara Tomy) (2010)
The 2010 Japan version by Takara Tomy sports brighter shades of gold and red than its original counterpart, as well as a red Autobot emblem on the chest as opposed to a silver-colored one.

Transformers: Timelines (Shattered Glass)

This Grimlock is an evil version of the Generation 1 character. It should also be noted that this Grimlock has Trypticon's colors.

According to the Tech Specs Grimlock was created as an experiment in artificial intelligence by the Decepticons which became too violent and Megatron shut him down. Optimus Prime then liberated Grimlock and let him work for the Autobots.

Initially Grimlock is a non-living machine without the ability to transform to a humanoid shape. Once granted an ember by the Omega Terminus he gains the ability to transform. His transformation seems to be tied to his emotions. When calm intellectual he gains a humanoid mode, but when enraged he is forced into dinosaur mode. Grimlock was reprogrammed by Optimus Prime to not be able to attack anything bearing the purple Autobot symbol, but after being granted an ember, he seems to have overcome this limitation.

Reception
The Botcon 2008 set was chosen as the "Action Figure Digest Hot Pick."

Fun Publications
Grimlock appears in the 2008 April Fool's comic "Shattered Expectations" by Fun Publications.

Grimlock appears as a member of Optimus Prime's forces in the Transformers: Timelines story "Shattered Glass". He helps defend the Ark from a Decepticon attack, but is overcome by the Predacons.

Grimlock appears in the preview to "Dungeons & Dinobots", printed in the Transformers Collectors Club magazine issue #22. Huffer attempts to capture Grimlock, but Grimlock chases him away while following a strange voice into the depths of Cybertron.

Grimlock appears in the text fiction "Dungeons & Dinobots". The mad Autobot scientist Wheeljack duplicates Grimlock's design to create an army of Dinobots, which he uses to attack the Decepticons, but sadly the dinobots attack each other in the frenzy of their first battle. Grimlock runs off, being called to the super computer known as the Omega Terminus, Grimlock is granted an ember, superior intelligence and the ability to transform. Followed by the Rodimus, Blurr, Cliffjumper and Sideswipe, he confronts the four with the aid of an army of zombie mechs, including the reanimated bodies of the dead Cliffjumper from his world and Sideswipe's old leader Drench. He bites the left hand off Rodimus during the battle, but thrown off a cliff during the fight. Although presumed dead he appears at the Autobot headquarters offering his services to Optimus Prime of his own free will, secretly planning on helping grant embers the various Dinobots and Dinocons.

In "Do Over" it is revealed that Grimlock had given the Dinobots and Dinocons embers, then returned them to the Autobots and Decepticons.

In Reunification Grimlock is seen gnawing on the body of Blurr, who was punished by Optimus Prime for failing to stop Rodimus from taking the Ark.

Toys
 Timelines Deluxe Grimlock (2008)
A BotCon '08 exclusive redeco of the Classics Grimlock figure in the colors of Generation 1 Trypticon.

Aligned continuity

There are two characters with the name Grimlock in the Aligned continuity. The first, featured in the video game, is known for not following orders or trusting in Optimus Prime's ability to be an effective leader. This Grimlock is evidently based on the original Generation 1 character. Gregg Berger reprises his role as Grimlock for the first time in 25 years since the 1984 cartoon series. This incarnation is evidently more intelligent than his Generation 1 counterpart, and initially speaks in a more coherent manner as with other characters. As the leader of the Lightning Strike Coalition Force, Grimlock enjoys smashing things first and asking questions later. Due to Shockwave's experiments, Grimlock has been left with a malfunctioning voice processor and alt-mode inspired by a distant primitive world.

The second Grimlock is part of Bumblebee's new team of Autobots in Transformers: Robots in Disguise, and is a more light hearted version of the character with a love of smashing but a fear of kittens. Some major changes from previous Grimlock incarnations is that along with not having a speech impediment that was shown in series prior, he also has a much more mild manner and a showingly kind personality with an artistic side, frequently doing art projects and sculptures as the series progresses. Despite this, he usually is shown as not the most intellectual character on the team. Coincidentally, this incarnation also sports green colors similar to the 2001's incarnation from the series also titled Transformers: Robots in Disguise.

Comics
The first Grimlock appears in the Transformers: Prime spinoff comic series, Rage of the Dinobots, in which he and the other Dinobots remain behind on Cybertron after Optimus Prime departs. Grimlock becomes the leader of a city known as Last Spark, ruling over and protecting the citizens in a monarchial fashion. He and the other Dinobots are forced to contend with the prejudices of other Cybertronians due to their altered states, as well as Shockwave's creations, which include a group of Decepticons known as the Forged.

Games
Grimlock appears as a minor character in the portable version of Transformers: War for Cybertron, and one of the main characters of subject in the 2012 game Transformers: Fall of Cybertron, In both games he is portrayed as impulsive loose cannon in the War For Cybertron game, believing he should rule the autobots and gets in a fight with Ironhide. In the sequel game, fall of cybertron, according to several logs  and a easter egg in Grimlock's room, Grimlock is proven difficult to reason with, and even had doubts of Optimus Prime's leadership even calling him weak in the penultimate chapter of the game. In the game,  he and his team are captured by Shockwave and the Insecticons and taken to a laboratory where Shockwave transforms them into the Dinobots. Grimlock becomes the first to break free following a brief encounter with the disgraced Starscream and proceeds to free three of four (Sludge having been put in stasis lock and left behind after they were captured) other members of his team, and discovered his Dinobot abilities. Grimlock successfully defeats the Insecticons and Shockwave, and destroy the space bridge that Megatron planned to use as a route to a perpetual energy source, Earth. Grimlock however, was still at the tower when it exploded, his fate remains unknown.

Toys
 Generations Voyager Grimlock (2013)

Animated series
In Transformers: Robots in Disguise, as one of many Decepticon prisoners aboard the Autobot ship Alchemor, Grimlock was the only one not to escape when the vessel crashed on Earth. The stasis unit on his cell was damaged however, and he was thus awake when the Autobots were engaging his former fellow inmate Underbite in the first pilot episode. He was freed after he insulted Underbite, and subsequently engaged the Decepticon in battle to satisfy his destructive impulses. Grimlock then proved an unlikely addition to Bumblebee's team, and with them witnessed the astonishing reappearance of Optimus Prime. After Underbite was imprisoned, Bumblebee decided to allow Grimlock to join the team on probation, and thus has been a major character in the series since. Later, after bringing the cyber-tick Minitron, he was formally inducted into the Autobot ranks and began to sport Autobot symbols instead of the Decepticon ones he sported in all of the episodes prior. According to Bumblebee, the only reason Grimlock was imprisoned on the Alchemor was due to severe property damage, which Bumblebee deemed to just be him acting like himself and not being a threat.

In Transformers: Power Of The Primes and (2018 Video Game) Earth Wars, the Dinobots get to combine into Volcanicus for the first and only time to fight against Predacons' Predaking.

Transformers: Cyberverse

Grimlock is one of the characters who appeared in Transformers: Cyberverse'', and unlike past versions of the character, is shown to be charismatic and civilized, only when in his Dino mode does he show impediments in speech (akin to Bruce Banner / The Incredible Hulk). This version also has missile launchers in his robot mode shoulders, and a seismic stomp attack more often paired with Dinobot Sludge. Grimlock was one of the many Autobots onboard the Ark before it crashed on Earth. Due to damages to the space shuttle, Grimlock woke out of stasis lock before everyone else. He fell off of the space ship when trying to save some stasis pods from being sucked out of a hole in the ship. Grimlock, now alone on prehistoric Earth, scanned a Tyrannosaurus alt. mode and became known as the King of the Dinosaurs.

References

 

3H Enterprises characters
Transformers characters
Devil's Due Publishing characters
Action film characters
Fictional characters with superhuman strength
Fictional commanders
Fictional construction workers
Fictional dinosaurs
Fictional illeists
Fictional kings
Fictional robotic dinosaurs
Fictional super soldiers
Fictional swordfighters
Fun Publications characters
Articles about multiple fictional characters
Male characters in animated series
Male characters in comics
Male characters in film
Television characters introduced in 1984